Oršanić is a Croatian surname. Notable people with the surname include:

Daniel Orsanic (born 1968), former Argentine tennis player 
Vlatka Oršanić (born 1958), Croatian opera singer and vocal pedagogue

Croatian surnames
Slavic-language surnames
Patronymic surnames